The 1951 Cincinnati Reds season was a season in American baseball. The team finished sixth in the National League with a record of 68–86, 28½ games behind the New York Giants.

Offseason 
 Prior to 1951 season: Bobby Durnbaugh was signed as an amateur free agent by the Reds.

Regular season

Season standings

Record vs. opponents

Notable transactions 
 June 1951: Bob Nieman was selected off waivers from the Reds by the Oklahoma City Indians.

Roster

Player stats

Batting

Starters by position 
Note: Pos = Position; G = Games played; AB = At bats; H = Hits; Avg. = Batting average; HR = Home runs; RBI = Runs batted in

Other batters 
Note: G = Games played; AB = At bats; H = Hits; Avg. = Batting average; HR = Home runs; RBI = Runs batted in

Pitching

Starting pitchers 
Note: G = Games pitched; IP = Innings pitched; W = Wins; L = Losses; ERA = Earned run average; SO = Strikeouts

Other pitchers 
Note: G = Games pitched; IP = Innings pitched; W = Wins; L = Losses; ERA = Earned run average; SO = Strikeouts

Relief pitchers 
Note: G = Games pitched; W = Wins; L = Losses; SV = Saves; ERA = Earned run average; SO = Strikeouts

Farm system

References

External links
1951 Cincinnati Reds season at Baseball Reference

Cincinnati Reds seasons
Cincinnati Reds season
Cincinnati Reds